Jacques Colon (born 15 September 1944) is a Belgian sports shooter. He competed in the mixed trap event at the 1976 Summer Olympics.

References

External links
 

1944 births
Living people
Belgian male sport shooters
Olympic shooters of Belgium
Shooters at the 1976 Summer Olympics
Sportspeople from Liège Province